Ayynoorum Ayynthum is a 2016 Indian Tamil-language drama film written and directed by Stanzin Raghu starring Deepak Sundararajan, Shankar, Living Smile Vidya, Chinnu Kuruvilla, T. M. Karthik, and Lakshmi Priyaa Chandramouli in the lead roles.

Plot 
The story is about the bizarre journey of a 500-rupee note through 5 different characters and how they perceive it in their own ways.

 Sudalai (Deepak Sundararajan) is a superstitious goon's stooge who wants to become a don. Will he realize his dream or will his misplaced sense of self get in the way of it?
 Adi (Shankar) is a successful film director who is separated from his wife thanks to his philandering ways. He is desperate to redeem himself and get her back. Will he be able to?
 Sundari (Living Smile Vidya) is a spunky woman who works at a phone recharge shop. All she wants is to safeguard the souvenir her boyfriend gives her. Will she hold on to it?
 Jenny (Chinnu Kuruvilla) is a volatile, troubled woman who  lives in a world where she walks a fine line between psychedelic reality and nightmarish fantasy. Will she rise above it or get sucked into a self-destructive vortex of darkness?
 A nameless, avant-garde revolutionary (T. M. Karthik) who lives without money ignites an unprecedented rebellion with which he threatens to raze down the hyper-capitalistic juggernaut.

Though the film follows the 500-rupee note, it actually focuses on the 5 key characters whose lives are entirely and contrastingly different from each other in the way they look at money.

Cast
 Deepak Sundararajan as Sudalai
 Shankar as Adi
 Living Smile Vidya as Sundari
 Chinnu Kuruvilla as Jenny
 T. M. Karthik as The Radical
 Lakshmi Priyaa Chandramouli as Anu
 Vishwanth Natarajan
 Ramesh Mourthy
 Vinoth Kumar

Production
After struggling to find producers and financing in a conventional way, the Accessible Horizon Films team decided that they had to something radical. But still, money was a big hurdle to get their scripts produced. That is when during and after several discussions about "money", the team decided to make their film about money (a 500-rupee note) and perceptions about it. Once the core concept "the journey of a 500-Rupee note" was decided, director Raghu wrote the screenplay in 15 days at a single stretch. Some of the characters of the film are loosely inspired from real life like the "money-less revolutionary" character played by T. M. Karthik, was inspired from people like Mark Boyle, Heidemarie Schwermer, and Suelo, among others. The casting of the film took two months with intense audition sessions held in Chennai, except for one character, Jenny, which took almost four months because of the extreme nature of the character. Several of the key cast members hail from a theater background with performances in Tamil, English, and Malayalam. The entire shooting schedule took about 21 days split over three to four schedules.

A one-minute trailer drew attention as soon as a promo was released on YouTube. A 5K marathon run was conducted to promote the concept of a world without money, and around 150 people participated in that marathon.

Soundtrack

The songs have been written and composed by S. Ramanujam and S. Balaji.

Critical reception
The film was officially selected at the International Film Festival of Kerala, Trivandrum in 2012 and at the Filmburo Baden-Wurttemberg's Stuttgart Indian Film Festival, Germany in 2013.

Release
The film was released unconventionally on the internet on the YouTube Channel of Accessible Horizon Films on 1 May 2016. Before the release, the makers had one special public screening at the Alliance Francaise, Madras on 29 April 2016. The producer stated that for three years, the Accessible Horizon Films team had been trying to release their film conventionally in theaters in Tamil Nadu, searching for distributors and trying to find people who might take their film and release it in theaters. The difficulty of releasing a film conventionally without financial backing or influence is just unimaginable especially when the film doesn't conform to the norms or the 'formula'. They initially thought of going conventionally only to reach a wide audience, because the film is about money, which everyone can relate to.

References

External links

2016 films
Indian independent films
2010s Tamil-language films